Magpahanggang Wakas (International title: I'll Never Say Goodbye / ) is a 2016 Philippine revenge drama television series based on the 1980 film Kastilyong Buhangin, starring Nora Aunor, Lito Lapid and Tonio Gutierrez. Directed by FM Reyes, it is topbilled by Jericho Rosales, Arci Muñoz and John Estrada. The series premiered on ABS-CBN's Primetime Bida evening block and worldwide via The Filipino Channel from September 19, 2016 to January 6, 2017, replacing Born for You, and was replaced by A Love to Last.

Synopsis
Waldo del Mar shares a deep love with Aryann Castillo. Although both of them are young, their love for each other is undeniably genuine.

However, this changes when one night Waldo accidentally kills a man who'd attempted to rape Aryann. Waldo was convicted and was sent to prison. Feeling responsible for Waldo's misfortune, Aryann takes on different jobs to raise money to get him out of jail and meets Tristan, who helps her out.

Soon after being freed, Waldo faces the vengeful brother of the man he killed and was shot. He falls off a cliff. and drifts into the sea - everyone except Aryann believes him dead. After finally having accepted Waldo's death, Aryann moves on and is set to be wed to Tristan; matters are complicated when a still-alive Waldo crosses paths with Aryann.

Cast and characters

Main cast
 Jericho Rosales as Engr. Ronualdo "Waldo" del Mar - King's brother, Kulas's son and Nenang's grandson.
 Arci Muñoz as Atty. Aryann Castillo - Rosing's niece.
 John Estrada as Tristan Lozado - Jenna's husband and Cheska's father.

Supporting cast
 Gelli de Belen as Jenna Celis-Lozado - Tristan's wife and Cheska's mother.
 Rita Avila as Rosita "Tyang Rosing" Natividad - Aryann's aunt.
 Lito Pimentel as Nicolas "Kulas" del Mar - Waldo and King's father and Nenang's son.
 Liza Lorena as Malena "Nenang" del Mar - Kulas's mother and Waldo and King's grandmother.
 Danita Paner as Leila Asuncion
 Maika Rivera as Cheska Lozado - Tristan and Jenna's daughter.
 Jomari Angeles as Enrique "King" del Mar - Waldo's youngest brother, Kulas's youngest son and Nenang's youngest grandson
 Marco Gumabao as Zachary "Zach" Flores - Simon's son.

Recurring cast
 Ronaldo Valdez as Antonio "Tony" Sandoval 
 Yen Santos as Clarissa "Issa" Ordoñez - Dante's daughter.
 Cris Villanueva as Simon Flores - Zach's father.

Guest cast
 Allan Paule as Armand Natividad
 Justin Cuyugan as Domingo "Dodong" Natividad
 Eric Fructuoso as Tonio Rodriguez
 Maila Gumila as Atty. Angela Vidal
 David Chua as Nico Gomez
 Precious Lara Quigaman as Gina Meyers
 Jeric Raval as Dante Ordoñez - Issa's father.
 Jojit Lorenzo as Percival "Percy" Moreno
 Pinky Amador as Atty. Thea Galvez
 Jennica Garcia as Angel Faustino
 Manuel Chua as Kyle Faustino
 Yves Flores as Marlon Miranda
 Gilleth Sandico as Beth Miranda
 Valerie Concepcion as Cassandra Flores

Reception

Production

Tentative title
The series was first announced on April 27, 2016 with a tentative title, Never Ever Say Goodbye. In August 2016, the drama's title was changed to Magpahanggang Wakas.

Casting
Magpahanggang Wakas marks the return of Jericho Rosales on primetime after his successful series Bridges of Love made waves in different Latin American countries, including Peru. Arci Muñoz returns in her second primetime series after her successful portrayal as Norma Elizondo in Pasión de Amor, a Philippine adaptation of Pasión de Gavilanes by Telemundo. It is also Rita Avila's comeback project on ABS-CBN four years after Walang Hanggan. Meanwhile, the melodrama is also Gelli de Belen and Danita Paner's first major primetime project since after leaving TV5.

Timeslot
Magpahanggang Wakas replaced Born for You on September 19, 2016 in an earlier timeslot at 8:45 pm after FPJ's Ang Probinsyano. ABS-CBN decided to move Till I Met You's timeslot at 9:30 pm.

Rerun
Magpahanggang Wakas re-aired on Kapamilya Channel and A2Z from April 5, 2021 to July 23, 2021 replacing the reruns of The Good Son and was replaced by the reruns of Nang Ngumiti ang Langit.

See also
List of programs broadcast by ABS-CBN
List of telenovelas of ABS-CBN
List of programs broadcast by Jeepney TV

References

External links

ABS-CBN drama series
Philippine melodrama television series
Philippine romance television series
2016 Philippine television series debuts
2017 Philippine television series endings
Live action television shows based on films
Filipino-language television shows
Television shows filmed in the Philippines